This is a list of labels controlled,  distributed or associated with Kakao M.

Subsidiaries

House labels

IST Entertainment

IST Entertainment is a record label established by Kakao M in November 2021. The label (previously known as Play M Entertainment) was established with the merger of Plan A Entertainment and FAVE Entertainment in April 2019.  On November 1, 2021, Play M Entertainment merged with Cre.ker Entertainment. The agency currently houses the groups Apink, Victon, The Boyz, Bandage, Weeekly, and ATBO.

BLUEDOT Entertainment
BLUEDOT Entertainment was established by Kakao M (formerly known as LOEN Entertainment) to manage their newest boygroup Just B that debuted on June 30, 2021. It is their first boy group to be launched after The Boyz who debuted in 2017.

EDAM Entertainment
EDAM Entertainment was established by Kakao M to manage their long-time soloist IU in 2020. On July 5, 2021, actress Shin Se-kyung signed with the label. On October 25, 2022, singer Woodz signed with the label.

Independent labels

Starship Entertainment

Starship Entertainment is an entertainment company founded by Kim Shi-dae in 2008. In 2013, Kakao M (formerly LOEN Entertainment) acquired 70% shares of Starship, became a majority owner of the label and making Starship as an independent subsidiary of Kakao M. In the same year, Starship announced its first subsidiary label "Starship X", which rapper Mad Clown was signed under. In 2015, King Kong Entertainment was acquired by Starship. In 2017, upon the merger of the businesses of the two companies, the company was relaunched as "King Kong by Starship". In the same year, Starship launched another subsidiary label House of Music, which focused on recruiting smaller, independent artists, with artist MoonMoon being the first signed under the label. In 2018, Starship renamed the label "Highline Entertainment".

Mun Hwa In
Mun Hwa In is an independent record label established by Kakao M (formerly LOEN Entertainment) in June 2016. It is currently being co-distributed by Kakao M and Mirrorball Music.

Source:

Groups
 Hanumpa
 AISLE
 Hey Men
 Bandage

Duos
 CRACKER
 ANTS
 Everlua
 Long:D

Soloists
 Lena Park
 OOHYO
 Yoon Hyun-sang
 Youra
 Aleph
 Rosy 
 Minchae
 KREAM
 I.NA
 Youngman
 JAENEY
 glowingdog

Studio artists
 Yoon Hyun-sang
 KREAM
 Youngman
 glowingdog
 CRACKER
 the night of Seokyo
 Collective Arts

High Up Entertainment
High Up Entertainment, also simply known as High Up, is a South Korean entertainment agency founded by producer duo Black Eyed Pilseung, in partnership with CJ E&M, in 2017.
On June 10, 2021, it was announced that Kakao Entertainment had acquired High Up Entertainment after becoming their largest shareholder, and therefore would become a Kakao Entertainment subsidiary.

Antenna

Former subsidiaries

Cantabile
Cantabile was a record label under Seoul Records (now LOEN Entertainment), founded in April 1991. It was the first record label in South Korea.

Avent
Avent was also a record label under Seoul Records, founded in April 2002.

Collabodadi Label
Collabodadi Label was also an in-house label of LOEN Entertainment (now Kakao M), founded in September 2013. It was led by Shinsadong Tiger. Prior to being chosen to lead the label, he produced the K-pop hits "Bo Peep Bo Peep" (T-ara), "Hot Issue" (4Minute), "U&I" (Ailee) and more.

The name Collabodadi is a portmanteau of 콜라보 (collabo - collaboration) and 보따리 (boddari - package).

In September 2015, the label's artists Fiestar and Zia were moved back to LOEN Tree (now known as Fave Entertainment).

WS Entertainment
WS Entertainment was a joint venture between Warner Music Korea, SK-KTB Music Investment Fund, and Seoul Records (now LOEN Entertainment). It was founded in 2006 and currently led by Philip Oh. The initial WS stands for Warner Music and SK Telecom.

E&T Story Entertainment
E&T Story Entertainment was founded on December 26, 2017, by Kakao M (formerly LOEN Entertainment) as a one-person agency of actress Kim So-hyun and led by Park Chan-woo. As January 2018, Play M Entertainment was acquisition 60% of E&T Story Entertainment shares.

Former artists

Former recording artists
 Run 
Park Ji-yoon (1997–1999)
Gain (2011–2013)
Sunny Hill (2011–2017)
Fiestar (2012–2018)
 Cheska (2012–2014)
 Jei (2012–2018)
 Linzy (2012–2018)
 Hyemi (2012–2018)
 Yezi (2012–2018)
 Cao Lu (2012–2018)
History (2013–2017)
 Song Kyung-il (2013–2019)
 Na Do-kyun (2013–2019)
 Kim Si-hyoung (2013–2019)
 Kim Jae-ho (2013–2019)
 Jang Yi-jeong (2013–2019)
 Shin Zisu (2015–2016)
I.B.I (2016)
JBJ (2017–2018)
Melody Day (2012–2018)
Seenroot (Munhwa In, 2013–2019)

Former actors
Kim Suk-hoon
Jo Han-sun
 Lee Jung-hyuk
 Kang Bok-eum

Distribution network

Current
Amoeba Culture (with CJ E&M)
Around Us Entertainment
Brand New Music (with Warner Music Korea)
Brave Entertainment (with CJ E&M)
C-JeS Entertainment 
Choon Entertainment
Coridel Entertainment
Cube Entertainment
DI Entertainment
DIMA Entertainment
DSP Media (excluding Click-B, whose distribution rights are handled by CJ E&M)
Eru Entertainment
FNC Entertainment
 High Up Entertainment (with Genie Music) 
Happy Face Entertainment (with Genie Music)
iHQ (with Universal Music Korea)
Jellyfish Entertainment (excluding VERIVERY, whose distribution rights are handled by  CJ E&M)
Jin-ah Entertainment
KBS Media (for Immortal Songs 2 compilation albums)
KeyEast (excluding Kim Hyun-joong, whose distribution rights are handled by CJ E&M)
 Music K Entertainment
Leessang Company
Maroo Entertainment (with NHN Entertainment)
MBK Entertainment (with Interpark)
Music&NEW
Music Farm
Mystic Story (with Dreamus)
NH Media (with TSN Company)
Nega Network
Polaris Entertainment (with KMP Holdings, Genie Music and CJ E&M)
SBS Contents Hub (for K-pop Star compilation albums)
Sniper Sound (with Pony Canyon Korea)
SidusHQ
Soul Shop Entertainment
SS Entertainment
SuneV
TOP Media
TS Entertainment
Ulala Company
Imagine Asia
Dream T Entertainment (acquired in 2013)
Cashmere Records (acquired in 2014)
Duble Kick Entertainment (acquired in 2014)
YMC Entertainment (acquired in 2015)
Woollim Entertainment (with Dreamus)

Former
B2M Entertainment
Hybe Corporation (formerly Big Hit Entertainment)
Big Hit Music
KOZ Entertainment
Pledis Entertainment
Source Music
iMBC (for Star Audition: Birth of a Great Star compilation albums) (2011-2013)
J. Tune Camp
JYP Entertainment
 Lion Media  (formerly Stam Entertainment)
 MLD Entertainment
Open World Entertainment (2006-2012)
RUI Entertainment
Stardom Entertainment
Star Empire Entertainment (2011-2015)
 Starkim Entertainment (formerly Startory Entertainment)
 Trophy Entertainment
Vitamin Entertainment (2006-2007) (acquired by Warner Music Korea)
 Vine Entertainment
WM Entertainment
 Yamazone Music

See also

LOEN Entertainment

References

External links

labels
 
Kakao M